Ivan Fyodorovich Dobronravov (born 2 June 1989) is a Russian actor best known for his lead role in the 2003 film Vozvrashcheniye (English title The Return).

Biography
Ivan Dobronravov was born in Voronezh, Russian SFSR, Soviet Union. Shchukin School Student (course Yu Nifontova).

Following the release of the film Andrey Zvyagintsev's "The Return" received five awards the Venice Film Festival, including the "Golden Lion", about the character of Ivan Dobronravova I wrote that this "stubborn chubby men will inhabit." In the picture Svetlana Proskurina "The Truce" the actor created a different way, "Egor - soft eyes lad Bartholomew. A good, naive and trusting as a child".

In 2010, Ivan Dobronravov won the Open Russian Film Festival "Kinotavr" in the category "Best Actor" (the film "The Truce").

Personal life
His father, Fyodor Dobronravov, is a People's Artist of Russia, and his elder brother Viktor Dobronravov is also an actor.

Filmography

Film

Television

References

External links 

1989 births
People from Voronezh
Russian male child actors
Russian male film actors
Russian male television actors
Living people
21st-century Russian male actors